The Group of Ten (G-10 or G10) refers to the group of countries that agreed to participate in the General Arrangements to Borrow (GAB), an agreement to provide the International Monetary Fund (IMF) with additional funds to increase its lending ability.

History 
The GAB was established in 1962, when the governments of eight International Monetary Fund (IMF) members—Belgium, Canada, France, Italy, Japan, the Netherlands, the United Kingdom, and the United States—and the central banks of two others, Germany and Sweden, agreed to make resources available to the IMF with an additional $6 billion of their resources. The additional money was intended to allow the IMF to have increased lending resources.

In 1964, the funds were used by the IMF to rescue the pound sterling. The G-10 grew in 1964 by the association of the eleventh member, Switzerland, then not a member of the IMF, but the name of the group remained the same.

Activities 
The GAB enables the IMF to borrow specified amounts of currencies from these eleven industrial countries (or their central banks), under certain circumstances. Specifically, a proposal for calls under the GAB may only be made when a proposal for the establishment of an activation period under the New Arrangements to Borrow (NAB) is not accepted by NAB participants, who number 38 countries, amongst which are the BRICS nations and Middle Eastern powers.

The GAB was established in 1962 and expanded in 1983 to SDR 17bn, from about SDR 6bn. It has been activated ten times, the last time in 1998. The GAB and the associated credit arrangement with Saudi Arabia have been renewed, without modifications, for a period of five years from December 26, 2013.

The Bank for International Settlements (BIS) hosts a publications e-library page for the G-10.

Observers 
The following international organizations are official observers of the activities of the G10: the BIS, European Commission, International Monetary Fund, and Organisation for Economic Co-operation and Development. Luxembourg is an associate member.

See also
 EU three
 Big Four (Western Europe)
 Group of Six (G6)
 Group of Seven (G7)
 Group of Twelve (G12)
 G10 currencies

References

External links
 IMF – A Guide To Committees, Groups, and Clubs

International development
International finance institutions
Economic country classifications
Intergovernmental organizations
20th-century diplomatic conferences
21st-century diplomatic conferences
Organizations established in 1962